Anne Van Parijs (born 14 April 1944) is a Belgian former swimmer. She competed in the women's 100 metre backstroke at the 1960 Summer Olympics.

References

External links
 

1944 births
Living people
Belgian female backstroke swimmers
Olympic swimmers of Belgium
Swimmers at the 1960 Summer Olympics
People from La Louvière
Sportspeople from Hainaut (province)